Cruzados is the 1985 debut album of Los Angeles rock band the Cruzados. It featured the band's "classic line-up" of Tito Larriva, Steven Hufsteter, Tony Marsico, and Chalo Quintana. It also featured the band's best known songs, such as "Motorcycle Girl" "Flor De Mal" and "Just Like Roses".

Track listing
"Wasted Years" (Steven Hufsteter)
"Rising Sun" (Tito Larriva, Hufsteter, Tony Marsico, Chalo Quintana)
"Hanging Out in California" (Hufsteter)
"Motorcycle Girl (Larriva, Marsico)
"Flor De Mal" (Larriva, Hufsteter)
"Cryin' Eyes" (Larriva, Marsico)
"Seven Summers" (Larriva)
"Some Day" (Larriva)
"1,000 Miles" (Larriva, Marsico)
"Just Like Roses" (Hufsteter)

Personnel
Tito Larriva - rhythm guitar, lead vocals
Steven Hufsteter - lead guitar
Tony Marsico - bass, backing vocals
Chalo Quintana - drums, percussion

Additional personnel
David Williams - backing vocals on "Wasted Years", "Rising Sun", and "Hanging Out in California"
J.J. Holiday - slide guitar on "Seven Summers"
Spyder Littleman - saxophone on "Seven Summers"
Gregory Kuehn - keyboards on "1,000 Miles" and "Just Like Roses"
Steve McRay - organ - on "Motorcycle Girl" and "Cryin' Eyes"
Paulinho Da Costa - percussion on "Hanging Out in California"
M.B. Gordy - percussion on "Some Day"
Frank Marsico - marimba on "Flor De Mal"
Walter Fowler - emulator programming
Paul Fox - emulator programming
Patrick Foley - "drum wiz"
Paul Greenstein - 1937 Indian Motorcycle sound effects on "Motorcycle Girl"

Production
Rodney Mills - producer, engineer
Bob Ludwig - mastering
Rik Pekkonen - track engineering
Gregory M. Quesnel - mixing
Gary Gross - photography
Jane Hoffman - styling
Wendy Ann Rosen - make-up
Clifford Peterson - hair-styling
Don Davenport - art direction

References

1985 debut albums
Cruzados albums
Albums produced by Rodney Mills
Arista Records albums